Stephen D. Pryor was president of ExxonMobil Chemical Company (a subsidiary of Exxon Mobil Corporation) from April 1, 2008 to January 1, 2015, and was vice-president of Exxon Mobil Corporation from December 1, 2004 to January 1, 2015.  Pryor joined Mobil Corporation in 1971, and from then on held various national and international positions. He retired as of January 1, 2015. He is one of the top three shareholders of ExxonMobil stock.

Education
Pryor was born in New York, NY. He has a bachelor's degree in Biology from Lafayette College and a master's degree in Business Administration from Harvard University.

Career
Since joining Mobil Corporation in 1971, Pryor has held various financial and managerial positions with the company. These have included positions as general manager in Cyprus and New Zealand; as vice president of Mobil Chemical Company in the United States; and as president of Mobil Asia Pacific.

After Exxon and Mobil merged in 1999, Pryor became president of the ExxonMobil Lubricants & Specialties Company and a vice president of Exxon Mobil Corporation. In 2002 he became executive vice president of ExxonMobil Chemical Company and in 2004, president of ExxonMobil Refining & Supply Company. He was vice-president of Exxon Mobil Corporation from December 1, 2004 to January 1, 2015, and served as president of ExxonMobil Chemical Company (a subsidiary of Exxon Mobil Corporation) from April 1, 2008 to January 1, 2015.

Pryor has served on the Executive Strategy Group of the International Council of Chemical Associations (ICCA), and is a proponent of the Responsible Care initiative, a voluntary global initiative to improve health, safety, and environmental performance within the chemical industry.

Awards
 2015, Chemical Industry Medal from the Society of Chemical Industry
 2015, Petrochemical Heritage Award from The Founders Club and the Chemical Heritage Foundation

References

American chemical industry businesspeople
American chief executives of Fortune 500 companies
ExxonMobil people
Harvard Business School alumni
Lafayette College alumni
Living people
Year of birth missing (living people)